Milton Rogovin Pronounced "ruh-GO-vin" (December 30, 1909 – January 18, 2011) was an American social documentary photographer. His photographs are in the Library of Congress, the J. Paul Getty Museum, the Center for Creative Photography and other distinguished institutions.

Biography

Early years

Milton Rogovin was born December 30, 1909, in Brooklyn, New York City, of ethnic Jewish parents who emigrated to America from Lithuania, then part of the Russian empire. He attended Stuyvesant High School in New York City and enrolled in Columbia University, from which he graduated in 1931 with a degree in optometry.

Following graduation Rogovin worked as an optometrist in New York City. Distressed by the rampant and worsening poverty resulting from the Great Depression, Rogovin began attending night classes at the New York Workers School, a radical educational institution sponsored by the Communist Party USA.

In 1938 Rogovin moved to Buffalo and established an optometry practice there.

In 1942, he married Anne Snetsky (later changed to Setters). In the same year, he was inducted into the U.S. Army, where he worked as an optometrist. After his discharge from the Army, Milton and Anne had three children: two daughters (Ellen and Paula) and a son (Mark).

Rogovin was called before the House Un-American Activities Committee in 1957. Like many other Americans who embraced Communism as a model for improving the quality of life for the working class, he became a subject of the Committee's attentions in the postwar period: He was discredited — without having been convicted of any offense — as someone whose views henceforth had to be discounted as dangerous and irresponsible.

Photographer

The incident inspired Rogovin to turn to photography as a means of expression; it was a way to continue to speak to the worth and dignity of people who make their livings under modest or difficult circumstances, often in physically taxing occupations that usually receive little attention.

In 1957, a collaboration with William Tallmadge, a professor of music, to document music at storefront churches set Rogovin on his photographic path. Some of the photographs that Rogovin made in the churches were published in 1962 in Aperture magazine, edited by Minor White, with an introduction by W.E.B. Du Bois, a founder of the National Association for the Advancement of Colored People (NAACP).

Rogovin worked on a month-long photographic series on the island of Chiloé, Chile. Poet, Pablo Neruda helped guide Rogovin and provide friends to drive and introduce Rogovin to contacts throughout the Island.
In 1976 Rogovin began photographing steel workers and electrical workers in the Buffalo/Lackawanna area. Seven years after the initial series, Rogovin returned in 1987 to the homes of the workers and found that not one worker was working where they had been photographed previously. The factories were torn down and the equipment was sold to Mexico or China. Michael Frisch from the State University of New York at Buffalo recorded 2,300 hours of interviews with these workers.

From 1981-1990, Rogovin photographed coal miners, a project that took him to Zimbabwe, France, Scotland, Spain, Cuba, China, and Mexico. Many of these images were published in his first book, The Forgotten Ones.

Rogovin traveled throughout the world, taking numerous portraits of workers and their families in many countries. His most acclaimed project, though, has been The Forgotten Ones, sequential portraits taken over three decades of over a hundred families who resided on Buffalo’s impoverished Lower West Side. The project was begun in 1972 and completed in 2002. In 1999, the Library of Congress collected Rogovin's negatives, contact sheets and thirteen hundred of Rogovin’s prints. They also hold 20,000 pieces of correspondence. The Center for Creative Photography holds 3,300 master prints—the master collection of Rogovin photography. Rogovin's rolleiflex camera, his FBI files and other resources are held by the Burchfield-Penney Art Center in Buffalo, NY.

Death and legacy

Rogovin died on January 18, 2011, a few weeks after his 101st birthday.

Publications
Milton Rogovin, Lower West Side, Buffalo, New York. Buffalo, NY: Albright-Knox Art Gallery, 1975.
Milton Rogovin: The Forgotten Ones. Buffalo, NY: Albright-Knox Art Gallery, 1985. .
Windows that Open inward: Images of Chile. Buffalo, NY: White Pine, 1985. ,  (paper). Buffalo, NY: White Pine, 1999. .
Portraits in Steel. Ithaca, NY: Cornell University Press, 1993. , .
Triptychs: Buffalo's Lower West Side Revisited. New York: Norton, 1994. .
The Bonds between Us: A Celebration of Family. Buffalo, NY: White Pine, 2001. .
Milton Rogovin: The Forgotten Ones. New York: Quantuck Lane, 2003. , .
With Eyes and Soul: Images of Cuba. Buffalo, NY: White Pine, 2004. .
Milton Rogovin: The Mining Photographs. Los Angeles: J. Paul Getty Museum, 2005. .
The Lens and the Pen: Photographs and Poems. Arroyo Seco, NM: Palisade, 2009. .
From the Western Door to the Lower West Side. Buffalo, NY: White Pine, 2010. .

Notes

External links
Milton Rogovin Web Site
Milton Rogovin Photograph Collection
NPR Interview from 2003
Board of Advisors, The Buffalo Film Festival, Buffalo, NY, United States

1909 births
2011 deaths
American centenarians
Men centenarians
Jewish American military personnel
United States Army personnel of World War II
American optometrists
American photographers
American socialists
Columbia University alumni
People from Brooklyn
Artists from Buffalo, New York
Stuyvesant High School alumni
United States Army soldiers
Documentary photographers
21st-century American Jews